Robert Ford is an American basketball coach who is currently the head coach of St. Xavier Cougars of which was under the bracket NAIA.

Coaching career 
He began his coaching stint with Grand Rapids Christian High School back in 2005, serving as the assistant head coach for the team.

In 2019, after spending his first two seasons as assistant coach for the Salem University Tigers, he was duly promoted to be the head coach of the team.

On June 26, 2021, he left the Salem University Tigers for a head coaching job for St. Xavier Cougars.

Head Coaching Record 
As of March 29, 2022

|-
| align="left" |Salem University Tigers
| align="left" |2018-19
|26||18||8||.6923 || align="center"| 
|-
| align="left" |Salem University Tigers
| align="left" |2019-20
|12||6||6||.5000 || align="center"| 
|-
| align="left" |St. Xavier Cougars
| align="left" |2021-22
|32||17||15||.5313 || align="center"| 
|-class="sortbottom"
| align="center" colspan=2|Career||70|||41|||29||.5857||

References

External links
Robert Ford coaching profile at St. Xavier's University

Living people
American men's basketball coaches
Basketball coaches from Michigan
Year of birth missing (living people)